Exavier Prente "Nook" Logan (born November 28, 1979) is a former Major League Baseball center fielder. He attended Copiah-Lincoln Community College. He made his Major League debut July 21, 2004, with the Detroit Tigers against the Kansas City Royals. He was named the Tigers' rookie of the year for 2004.

On August 29, 2006, Logan was designated for assignment by the Tigers. On September 1 of that year, he was traded to the Washington Nationals, after asking Detroit management for a trade. Upon arriving in Washington, Logan immediately impressed with his spectacular catches and speed. Logan was recognized that year as the fastest player in Major League Baseball. He ended up hitting .300 and making several impressive catches in the field.

In 2007, Logan was the opening day center fielder for the Nationals. He injured his foot that day after crashing into the wall in the outfield. He would be out for over a month but ended up hitting .265 after slumping toward the tail end of the season. Logan's lack of power prompted the Nationals to look for a power-hitting outfielder to replace him at season's end. Logan was not offered a new contract by the Nationals and became a free agent on December 12, 2007.

On December 13, 2007, Logan was identified in the Mitchell Report as a client of Kirk Radomski, who distributed banned performance-enhancing substances to MLB players. He would later admit that he used Human Growth Hormone (HGH), a legal substance, banned by Major League Baseball, in order to recover from his injury in the minor leagues.

On February 15, 2008, Logan signed a minor league contract with the Los Angeles Dodgers. Without a chance of making the team's opening day roster Logan became a free agent. On June 23, he signed with the Long Island Ducks of the independent Atlantic League and played out the season.

In 2010 Logan played for the Newark Bears.

He has since spoken of the Mitchell Report as having had a "huge impact" on his ability to sign on with another Major League Baseball club.

See also

 List of Major League Baseball players named in the Mitchell Report

External links

Long Island Ducks player page
2007 spring training highlight video from The Washington Post
Washington Post

1979 births
Living people
Major League Baseball center fielders
Baseball players from Mississippi
Sportspeople from Natchez, Mississippi
Detroit Tigers players
Washington Nationals players
Toledo Mud Hens players
African-American baseball players
Newark Bears players
Long Island Ducks players
Grand Prairie AirHogs players
21st-century African-American sportspeople
20th-century African-American sportspeople